The Northern Pacific Railway  was a transcontinental railroad that operated across the northern tier of the western United States, from Minnesota to the Pacific Northwest.

Construction began in 1870 and the main line opened all the way from the Great Lakes to the Pacific when former President Ulysses S. Grant drove in the final "golden spike" in western Montana on September 8, 1883. In addition, the NP had an international branch to Winnipeg, Manitoba, Canada. The main activities were shipping wheat and other farm products, cattle, timber, and minerals; bringing in consumer goods, transporting passengers; and selling land.

The Northern Pacific was headquartered in Minnesota, first in Brainerd, then in Saint Paul.  It had a tumultuous financial history; the NP merged with other lines in 1970 to form the Burlington Northern Railroad, which in turn merged with the Santa Fe Railway to become the BNSF Railway in 1996.

History

Organization

Congress chartered the Northern Pacific Railway Company on July 2, 1864, with the goals of connecting the Great Lakes with Puget Sound on the Pacific, opening vast new lands for farming, ranching, lumbering and mining, and linking Washington and Oregon to the rest of the country.

Congress granted the railroad a potential  of land in exchange for building rail transportation to an undeveloped territory. Josiah Perham was elected its first president on December 7, 1864. It could not use all the land and in the end took just under 40 million acres.

Jay Cooke takes control
For the next six years, backers of the road struggled to find financing. The backing and promotions of famed financier Jay Cooke in the summer of 1870 brought the first real momentum to the company.

Over the course of 1871, the Northern Pacific pushed westward from Minnesota into present-day North Dakota. Surveyors and construction crews had to maneuver through swamps, bogs, and tamarack forests. The difficult terrain and insufficient funding delayed by six months the construction phase in Minnesota. The NP also began building its line north from Kalama, Washington Territory, on the Columbia River outside of Portland, Oregon, towards Puget Sound. Four small construction engines were purchased, the Minnetonka, Itaska, Ottertail and St. Cloud, the first of which was shipped to Kalama by ship around Cape Horn. In Minnesota, the Lake Superior and Mississippi Railroad completed construction of its  line stretching from Saint Paul to Lake Superior at Duluth in 1870. It was leased to the Northern Pacific in 1876 and was eventually absorbed by the Northern Pacific.  The North Coast Limited was the Northern Pacific's flagship train and the Northern Pacific itself was built along the trail first blazed by Lewis and Clark.

The Northern Pacific reached Fargo, Dakota Territory (now North Dakota), early in June 1872. Surveys were carried out in North Dakota protected by 600 troops under General Winfield Scott Hancock. Headquarters and shops were established in Brainerd, Minnesota, a town named for the President John Gregory Smith's wife Anna Elizabeth Brainerd. A severe stock market crash and financial collapse after 1873, led by the Credit Mobilier Scandal and the Union Pacific Railroad fraud, stopped further railroad building for twelve years.

In 1886, the company put down  of main line across North Dakota, with an additional  in Washington. On November 1, General George Washington Cass became the third president of the company. Cass had been a vice-president and director of the Pennsylvania Railroad and would lead the Northern Pacific through some of its most difficult times.

Attacks on survey parties and construction crews by Sioux, Cheyenne, Arapaho, and Kiowa warriors in North Dakota and Minnesota became so prevalent that the company received protection from units of the U.S. Army.

Settlement

In 1886, the Northern Pacific also opened colonization offices in Germany and Scandinavia, attracting farmers with cheap package transportation and purchase deals. The success of the NP was based on the abundant crops of wheat and other grains and the attraction to settlers of the Red River Valley along the Minnesota-North Dakota border between 1881 and 1890.

The Northern Pacific reached Dakota Territory at Fargo in 1872 and began its career as one of the central factors in the economic growth of North Dakota. The climate, although very cold, was suitable for wheat, which was in high demand in the cities of the United States and Europe. Most of the settlers were German and Scandinavian immigrants who bought the land cheaply and raised large families. They shipped huge quantities of wheat to Minneapolis, while buying all sorts of equipment and home supplies to be shipped in by rail.

The NP used its federal land grants as security to borrow money to build its system. The federal government kept every other section of land, and gave it away free to homesteaders. At first the railroad sold much of its holdings at low prices to land speculators in order to realize quick cash profits, and also to eliminate sizable annual tax bills. By 1905 the railroad company's land policies changed, after it was judged a costly mistake to have sold much of the land at wholesale prices. With better railroad service and improved methods of farming the Northern Pacific easily sold what had been heretofore "worthless" land directly to farmers at good prices. By 1910 the railroad's holdings in North Dakota had been greatly reduced.

Panic of 1873 and first bankruptcy
In 1873, Northern Pacific made impressive strides before a terrible stumble. Rails from the east reached the Missouri River on June 4. After several years of study, Tacoma, Washington, was selected as the road's western terminus on July 14, 1873.

For the previous three years the financial house of Jay Cooke and Company had been throwing money into the construction of the Northern Pacific. As with many western transcontinentals, the staggering costs of building a railroad into a vast wilderness had been drastically underestimated.  Cooke had little success in marketing the bonds in Europe and overextended his house in meeting overdrafts of the mounting construction costs. Cooke overestimated his managerial skills and failed to appreciate the limits of a banker's ability to be also a promoter, and the danger of freezing his assets in the bonds of the Northern Pacific. Cooke and Company went bankrupt on September 18, 1873. Soon the Panic of 1873 engulfed the United States, beginning an economic depression that ruined or nearly paralyzed newer railroads.

The Northern Pacific survived bankruptcy that year, due to austerity measures put in place by President Cass. On December 16, the first steam train arrived in Tacoma. But in 1874 the company was moribund.

Northern Pacific slipped into its first bankruptcy on June 30, 1875. Cass resigned to become receiver of the company, and Charles Barstow Wright became its fourth president. Frederick Billings, namesake of Billings, Montana, formulated a reorganization plan which was put into effect.

Throughout 1874 to 1876, elements of the 7th Cavalry Regiment under the command of Lieutenant Colonel George Armstrong Custer operating out of Forts Abraham Lincoln and Rice in Dakota Territory conducted expeditions to protect the railroad survey and construction crews in Dakota and Montana Territories.

Frederick Billings and first reorganization
In 1877, construction resumed in a small way. Northern Pacific pushed a branch line southeast from Tacoma to Puyallup, Washington and on to the coal fields around Wilkeson, Washington. Much of the coal was destined for export through Tacoma to San Francisco, California, where it would be thrown into the fireboxes of Central Pacific Railroad steam engines.

This small amount of construction was one of the largest projects the company would undertake in the years between 1874 and 1880. That same year the company built a large shop complex at Edison, Washington (now part of south Tacoma). For many years the shops at Brainerd and Edison would carry out heavy repairs and build equipment for the railroad.

On May 24, 1879, Frederick H. Billings became the president of the company. Billings' tenure would be short but ferocious. Reorganization, bond sales, and improvement in the U.S. economy allowed Northern Pacific to strike out across the Missouri River by letting a contract to build  of railroad west of the river. The railroad's new-found strength, however, would be seen as a threat in certain quarters.

Henry Villard, Gold Creek, Gold Spike

German-born journalist Henry Villard had raised capital for western railroads in Europe from 1871 to 1873. After returning to New York in 1874, he invested on behalf of his clients in railroads in Oregon. Through Villard's work, most of these lines became properties of the European creditors' holding company, the Oregon and Transcontinental Company.

Of the lines held by the Oregon and Transcontinental, the most important was the Oregon Railway and Navigation Company, which ran east from Portland along the left bank of the Columbia River to a connection with the Union Pacific Railroad's Oregon Short Line at the confluence of the Columbia River and the Snake River near Wallula, Washington.

Within a decade of his return, Villard was head of a transportation empire in the Pacific Northwest that had but one real competitor, the Northern Pacific. The Northern Pacific's completion threatened the holdings of Villard in the Northwest, and especially in Portland. Portland would become a second-class city if the Puget Sound ports at Tacoma and Seattle, Washington, were connected to the East by rail.

Villard, who had been building a monopoly of river and rail transportation in Oregon for several years, now launched a daring raid. Using his European connections and a reputation for having "bested" Jay Gould in a battle for control of the Kansas Pacific years before, Villard solicited and raised $8,000,000 from his associates. This was his famous "Blind Pool," Villard's associates were not told what the money would be used for. In this case, the funds were used to purchase control of the Northern Pacific.

Despite a tough fight, Billings and his backers were forced to capitulate; he resigned the presidency June 9, 1881. Ashbel H. Barney, former President of Wells Fargo & Company, served briefly as interim caretaker of the railroad from June 19 to September 15, when Villard was elected president by the stockholders. For the next two years, Villard and the Northern Pacific rode the whirlwind.

On October 10, 1882, the line from Wadena, Minnesota, to Fergus Falls, Minnesota, opened for service. The Missouri River was bridged with a million-dollar span on October 21, 1883. Until then, crossing of the Missouri had had to be managed with a ferry service for most of the year; in winter, when ice was thick enough, rails were laid across the river itself.

General Herman Haupt, another veteran of the Civil War and the Pennsylvania Railroad, organized the Northern Pacific Beneficial Association in 1881. A forerunner of the modern health maintenance organization, the NPBA ultimately established a series of four hospitals across the system in Saint Paul, Minnesota; Glendive, Montana; Missoula, Montana; and Tacoma, Washington, to care for employees, retirees, and their families.

On January 15, 1883, the first train reached Livingston, Montana, at the eastern foot of Bozeman Pass. Livingston, like Brainerd and South Tacoma before it, would grow to encompass a large backshop handling heavy repairs for the railroad. It would also mark the east–west dividing line on the Northern Pacific system.

Villard pushed hard for the completion of the Northern Pacific in 1883. His crews laid an average of a mile and half of track each day. In early September, the line neared completion. To celebrate, and to gain national publicity for investment opportunities in his region, Villard chartered four trains to carry guests from the East to Gold Creek in western Montana. No expense was spared, and the list of dignitaries included Frederick Billings, Ulysses S. Grant, and Villard's in-laws, the family of abolitionist William Lloyd Garrison. On September 8, the Gold Spike was driven near Gold Creek.

Direct to Puget Sound

Villard's fall was swifter than his ascendancy. Like Jay Cooke, he was now consumed by the enormous costs of constructing the railroad. Wall Street bears attacked the stock shortly after the Golden Spike, after the realization that the Northern Pacific was a very long road with very little business. Villard himself suffered a nervous breakdown in the days after the driving of the Golden Spike, and he left the presidency of the Northern Pacific in January 1884.

Again, the presidency of the Northern Pacific was handed to a professional railroader, Robert Harris, former head of the Chicago, Burlington and Quincy Railroad. For the next four years, until the return of the Villard group, Harris worked at improving the property and ending its tangled relationship with the Oregon Railway and Navigation Company.

Throughout the mid-1880s, the Northern Pacific pushed to reach Puget Sound directly, rather than by means of a roundabout route that followed the Columbia River. Surveys of the Cascade Mountains, carried out intermittently since the 1870s, began anew. Virgil Bogue, a veteran civil engineer, was sent to explore the Cascades again. On March 19, 1881, he discovered Stampede Pass. In 1883, John W. Sprague, the head of the new Pacific Division, drove the Golden Spike to mark the beginning of the railroad from what would become Kalama, Washington. He resigned a months later due to impaired health.

In 1884, after the departure of Villard, the Northern Pacific began building toward Stampede Pass from Wallula in the east and the area of Wilkeson in the west. By the end of the year, rails had reached Yakima, Washington in the east. A  gap remained in 1886.

In January of that year, Nelson Bennett was given a contract to construct a  tunnel under Stampede Pass. The contract specified a short amount of time for completion, and a large penalty if the deadline were missed. While crews worked on the tunnel, the railroad built a temporary switchback route across the pass. With numerous timber trestles and grades which approached six percent, the temporary line required two M class 2-10-0s—the two largest locomotives in the world (at that time)—to handle a tiny five-car train. On May 3, 1888, crews holed through the tunnel, and on May 27 the first train passed through directly to Puget Sound.

Villard and the Panic of 1893
Despite this success, the Northern Pacific, like many U.S. roads, was living on borrowed time. From 1887 until 1893, Henry Villard returned to the board of directors. Though offered the presidency, he refused. An associate of Villard dating back to his time on the Kansas Pacific, Thomas Fletcher Oakes, assumed the presidency on September 20, 1888.

In an effort to garner business, Oakes pursued an aggressive policy of branch line expansion. In addition, the Northern Pacific experienced the first competition in the form of James Jerome Hill and his Great Northern Railway. The Great Northern, like the Northern Pacific before it, was pushing west from the Twin Cities towards Puget Sound, and would be completed in 1893.

Mismanagement, sparse traffic, and the Panic of 1893 sounded the death knell for the Northern Pacific and Villard's interest in railroading. The company slipped into its second bankruptcy on October 20, 1893. Oakes was named receiver and Brayton Ives, a former chairman of the New York Stock Exchange, became president.

Railroad labor dispute
In 1894, the 10th Cavalry Regiment of the U.S. Army was involved in protecting property of the Northern Pacific Railroad from striking workers.

From Villard to Morganization
For the next three years, the Villard-Oakes interests and the Ives interest feuded for control of the Northern Pacific. Oakes was eventually forced out as receiver, but not before three separate courts were claiming jurisdiction over the Northern Pacific's bankruptcy. Things came to a head in 1896, when first Edward Dean Adams was appointed president, then less than two months later, Edwin Winter.

Ultimately, the task of straightening out the muddle of the Northern Pacific was turned over to J. P. Morgan. Morganization of the Northern Pacific, a process which befell many U.S. roads in the wake of the Panic of 1893, was handed to Morgan lieutenant Charles Henry Coster. The new president, beginning September 1, 1897, was Charles Sanger Mellen.

Though James J. Hill had purchased an interest in the Northern Pacific during the troubled days of 1896, Coster and Mellen would advocate, and follow, a staunchly independent line for the Northern Pacific for the next four years. Only the early death of Coster from overwork, and the promotion of Mellen to head the Morgan-controlled New York, New Haven and Hartford Railroad in 1903, would bring the Northern Pacific closer to the orbit of James J. Hill.

Hill, Harriman and the Northern Pacific Corner
In the late 1880s, the Villard regime, in another one of its costly missteps, attempted to stretch the Northern Pacific from the Twin Cities to the all-important rail hub of Chicago, Illinois. A costly project was begun in creating a union station and terminal facilities for a Northern Pacific which had yet to arrive.

Rather than build directly down to Chicago, perhaps following the Mississippi River as the Chicago, Burlington and Quincy had done, Villard chose to lease the Wisconsin Central. Some backers of the Wisconsin Central had long associations with Villard, and an expensive lease was worked out between the two companies which was only undone by the Northern Pacific's second bankruptcy.

The ultimate result was that the Northern Pacific was left without a direct connection to Chicago, the primary interchange point for most of the large U.S. railroads. Fortunately, the Northern Pacific was not alone. James J. Hill, controller of the Great Northern Railway, which was completed between the Twin Cities and Puget Sound in 1893, also lacked a direct connection to Chicago. Hill went looking for a road with an existing route between the Twin Cities and Chicago which could be rolled into his holdings and give him a stable path to that important interchange. At the same time, E. H. Harriman, head of the Union Pacific Railroad, was also looking for a road which could connect his company to Chicago.

The road both Harriman and Hill looked at was the Chicago, Burlington and Quincy. To Harriman, the Burlington was a road which paralleled much of his own and offered tantalizing direct access to Chicago. For Hill as well, there was the possibility of a high-speed link directly with Chicago. Though the Burlington did not parallel the Great Northern or the Northern Pacific, it would give them a powerful railroad in the central West. Harriman was the first to approach the Burlington's aging leader, the irascible Charles Elliott Perkins. The price for control of the Burlington, as set by Perkins, was $200 a share, more than Harriman was willing to pay. Hill met the price, and control of the Burlington was divided equally at about 48.5 percent each between the Great Northern and the Northern Pacific.

Not to be outdone, Harriman now came up with a crafty plan: buy a controlling interest in the Northern Pacific and use its power on the Burlington to place friendly directors upon its board. On May 3, 1901, Harriman began his stock raid which would become known as the Northern Pacific Corner. By the end of the day, he was short just 40,000 shares of common stock. Harriman placed an order to cover this, but was overridden by his broker, Jacob Schiff, of Kuhn, Loeb & Co. Hill, on the other hand, reached the vacationing Morgan in Italy and managed to place an order for 150,000 shares of common stock. Though Harriman might be able to control the preferred stock, Hill knew the company bylaws allowed for the holders of the common stock to vote to retire the preferred.

In three days, the Harriman-Hill imbroglio managed to wreak havoc on the stock market. Northern Pacific stock was quoted at $150 a share on May 6 and is reported to have traded as much as $1,000 a share behind the scenes. Harriman and Hill now worked to settle the issue for brokers to avoid panic. Hill, for his part, attempted to avoid future stock raids by placing his holdings in the Northern Securities Company, a move which would be undone by the Supreme Court in 1904 under the auspices of the Sherman Anti-Trust Act. Harriman was not immune either; he was forced to break up his holdings in the Union Pacific Railroad and the Southern Pacific Railroad a few years later.

From Hill to Howard Elliott
In 1903, Hill finally got his way with the House of Morgan. Howard Elliott, another veteran of the Chicago, Burlington and Quincy, became president of the Northern Pacific on October 23. Elliott was a relative of the Burlington's crusty chieftain Charles Elliott Perkins, and more distantly the Burlington's great backer, John Murray Forbes. He had spent 20 years in the trenches of Midwest railroading, where rebates, pooling, expansion and rate wars had brought ruinous competition. Having seen the effects of having multiple railroads attempt to serve the same destination, he was very much in tune with James J. Hill's philosophy of "community of interest," a loose affiliation or collusion among roads in an attempt to avoid duplicating routes, rate wars, weak finances and ultimately bankruptcies and reorganizations. Elliott would be left to make peace with the Hill-controlled Great Northern; the Harriman-controlled Union Pacific; and, between 1907 and 1909, the last of the northern transcontinentals, the Chicago, Milwaukee, St. Paul and Pacific Railroad, more commonly known as the Milwaukee Road.

Into the twentieth century
The Northern Pacific steadily improved after the turn of the century. Together with the Great Northern, the Northern Pacific also gained control of the Chicago, Burlington and Quincy Railroad, gaining important access to Chicago, the central Middle West and Texas, as well as the Spokane, Portland and Seattle Railway, an important route through eastern and southern Washington. Its physical plant was upgraded continuously, with double tracking in key areas and automatic block signaling along its entire main line. This in turn gave way to centralized traffic control, microwave communications, and radio communications as time progressed.

The Northern Pacific continuously maintained and upgraded its equipment and service. The road helped pioneer the 4-8-4 Northern type steam engine and the 2-8-8-4 Yellowstone. It was also among the first railroads in the country to dieselize—beginning with General Motors’ FTs in 1944—albeit among the last to complete dieselization, not doing so until 1960 owing to low cost (albeit low quality) coal reserves in Wyoming.

The Northern Pacific's premier passenger train, the North Coast Limited, was among the safest and finest in the nation, suffering only one passenger fatality in nearly seventy years of operation.

By 1900, most of the remaining land-grant holdings were located west of Montana, in the "western district". The railroad still hoped to sell this land, both to provide operating funds and to populate the region to provide new markets to sustain the railroad. Nearly all the good farmlands had been sold, leaving large tracts of grazing land or timber. The grazing acreage was poor quality and difficult to sell. However, the timber lands were of high quality; much of these were sold to Frederick Weyerhaeuser.

Unification of the Hill Lines
In later years, Louis W. Menk became president of the Northern Pacific, and then he brought it together with the Chicago, Burlington and Quincy Railroad, the Great Northern Railway, and the Spokane, Portland and Seattle Railway on March 2, 1970, to form the Burlington Northern Railroad. The merger was allowed despite a challenge in the Supreme Court, essentially reversing the outcome of the 1904 Northern Securities ruling. A  portion of the former Northern Pacific mainline in Montana was spun off to form the Montana Rail Link. However, as of January 10, 2022, BNSF ended their lease of the former Northern Pacific right-off-way to the MRL and is set to return to the direct management of the BNSF.

Divisions

Lake Superior
Headquartered in Duluth, Minnesota, the Lake Superior Division's main routes were from Duluth to Ashland, Wisconsin, Duluth to Staples, Minnesota, and Duluth to White Bear Lake, Minnesota. The division encompassed 631 route miles: 356 in main line and 274 in branches.

St. Paul
Headquartered in St. Paul, Minnesota in the company's Railroad and Bank Building, the St. Paul Division's main routes were from Saint Paul to Staples, Saint Paul to White Bear Lake, and Staples to Dilworth, Minnesota. The division encompassed 909 route miles: 310 in main line and 599 in branches.

Fargo
Headquartered in Fargo, North Dakota, the Fargo Division's main routes were from Dilworth to Mandan, North Dakota. The division encompassed 1,167 route miles: 216 in main line and 951 in branches.

Yellowstone
Headquartered in Glendive, Montana, the Yellowstone Division's main routes were from Mandan, North Dakota, to Billings, Montana, and from Billings to Livingston, Montana. The division encompassed 875 route miles: 546 in main line and 328 in branches.

Rocky Mountain
Headquartered in Missoula, Montana, the Rocky Mountain Division's main routes were from Livingston to Paradise, Montana via Helena, Montana and Mullan Pass, and from Logan, Montana, to Garrison, Montana, via Butte, Montana, and Homestake Pass. The division encompassed 892 route miles: 563 in main line and 330 in branches. It was home to the principal central district repair facility at Livingston, Montana.

Idaho
Headquartered in Spokane, Washington, the Idaho Division's main routes were from Paradise, Mont., to Yakima, Washington, via Pasco, Washington. The division encompassed 1,123 route miles: 466 in main line and 657 in branches.

Tacoma
Headquartered in Tacoma, Washington, the Tacoma Division's main routes were from Yakima to Stuck Junction, near future Auburn, Washington, Seattle, Washington to Sumas, Washington, on the border with British Columbia, Canada, and from Seattle to Portland, Oregon. The division encompassed 1,034 route miles: 373 in main line and 661 in branches. It was home to the principal west end repair facility at South Tacoma, Washington.

As the railroad expanded, immigrants, families, and single men moved to the Pacific Northwest. Tacoma's population grew rapidly: in 1880 there were 1,098 residents, and in 1889 there were 36,000.

Passenger service

The North Coast Limited was the premier passenger train operated by the Northern Pacific Railway between Chicago and Seattle via Butte, Montana and Homestake Pass. It commenced service on April 29, 1900, served briefly as a Burlington Northern train after the merger on March 2, 1970, and ceased operation on April 30, 1971, the day before Amtrak began service. The Chicago Union Station to Saint Paul leg of the train's route was operated by the Chicago, Burlington and Quincy Railroad along its Mississippi River mainline through Wisconsin.

The Northern Pacific's secondary transcontinental passenger train was the Alaskan, until it was replaced by the Mainstreeter on November 16, 1952. The Mainstreeter, which operated via Helena, Montana and Mullan Pass, continued in service through the Burlington Northern merger until Amtrak Day (May 1, 1971). It had been reduced to a Saint Paul to Seattle train after the last run of the former Burlington Route Black Hawk on April 12–13, 1970.

The Northern Pacific also participated in the Coast Pool Train service between Portland and Seattle with the Great Northern Railway and the Union Pacific Railroad. NP and GN Coast Pool Trains lasted until Amtrak.

There were several other passenger trains which were discontinued before the Burlington Northern merger. These included:
 Saint Paul to International Falls, Minnesota;
 Saint Paul to Duluth, Minnesota (which at one time was also a pool operation, with Great Northern Railway and the Soo Line);
 Duluth to Staples, Minnesota;
 Saint Paul to Jamestown, North Dakota (the last remnant of the Alaskan);
Fargo, North Dakota to Winnipeg, Manitoba;

The Route of "the Great Big Baked Potato"

Hazen Titus was appointed as the line's dining car superintendent in 1908.  He learned that Yakima Valley farmers were unable to sell their potato crops because the potatoes they were growing were simply too large; they fed them to the hogs. Titus learned that a single potato could weigh from two to five pounds, but that smaller potatoes were preferred by the end buyers of the vegetable because many people considered large potatoes inedible due to their thick, rough skin.

Titus and his staff discovered the "inedible" potatoes were delicious after baking in a slow oven.  He contracted to purchase as many potatoes as the farmers could produce that were more than two pounds in weight.  Soon after the first delivery of "Netted Gem Bakers", they were offered to diners on the North Coast Limited beginning in early 1909. Word of the line's specialty offering traveled quickly, and before long it was using "the Great Big Baked Potato" as a slogan to promote the railroad's passenger service. Hollywood stars were hired to promote it.  When an addition was built for the Northern Pacific's Seattle commissary in 1914, a Railway Age reporter wrote, "A large trade mark, in the shape of a baked potato, 40 ft. long and 18 ft. in diameter, surmounts the roof. The potato is electric lighted and its eyes, through the electric mechanism, are made to wink constantly.  A cube of butter thrust into its split top glows intermittently."  Premiums such as postcards, letter openers, and spoons were also produced to promote "The Route of the Great Big Baked Potato"; the slogan served the Northern Pacific for about 50 years.

Presidents

Presidents of Northern Pacific Railway were:
 Josiah Perham, 1864–1866.
 John Gregory Smith, 1866–1872.
 George Washington Cass, 1872–1875.
 Charles Barstow Wright, 1875–1879.
 Frederick Billings, 1879–1881.
 Henry Villard, 1881–1884.
 Robert Harris, 1884–1888.
 Thomas Fletcher Oakes, 1888–1893.
 Brayton Ives, 1893–1896.
 Edward Dean Adams, 1896.
 Edwin Winter, 1896.
 Charles Sanger Mellen, 1897–1903.
 Howard Elliott, 1903–1913.
 Jule Murat Hannaford, 1913–1920.
 Charles Donnelly, 1920–1939.
 Charles Eugene Denney, 1939–1950.
 Robert Stetson Macfarlane, 1951–1966.
 Louis W. Menk, 1966–1970.

Chief engineers
Edwin Ferry Johnson (1803–1872), engineer-in-chief, 1867. Wrote The Railroad To the Pacific, Northern Route, Its General Characteristics, Relative Merits, Etc. in 1854.
William Milnor Roberts (1810–1881), engineer-in-chief, 1869 to 1879. Proposed the general route of the Northern Pacific from Bismarck to Portland. Also, Vice President, American Society of Civil Engineers, 1873 to 1878, and then President, 1878.
Adna Anderson (1827–1889), engineer-in-chief, February 18, 1880, to January 1888. In October 1886, he was also named second vice-president of the Northern Pacific. He completed the line between Saint Paul, Minnesota, and Wallula (where it connected with the Oregon Railway and Navigation Company's line to Portland), witnessing the driving of the last spike on September 8, 1883. Thereafter, he evaluated possible routes for the Cascade Division, intended to connect the NP at some point near the mouth of the Snake River with Tacoma, Washington on Puget Sound. Preliminary reconnaissance and surveys began in March 1880, and in autumn, 1883, Anderson concluded that the line should be built through Stampede Pass.
John William Kendrick (1853–1924), chief engineer, January 1888, to July 1893. From July 1893, to February 1, 1899, he was general manager of the reorganized Northern Pacific Railway.
Edwin Harrison McHenry (1859 – August 21, 1931), chief engineer, July 1893, to September 1, 1901. Subsequently, he was chief engineer for the Canadian Pacific Railway and then fourth vice-president of the New York, New Haven and Hartford Railroad.
William Lafayette Darling (1856–1938), chief engineer, September 1, 1901, to September 1903, and January 1906, to 1916. Between 1905 and 1906, he was chief engineer for the Chicago, Milwaukee, St. Paul and Pacific Railroad, returning to the NP in 1906 as chief engineer and also vice-president and engineer in charge of construction of the Spokane, Portland and Seattle Railway.
Edward J. Pearson (1863–1928), chief engineer, September 1903, to December 1905.
Howard Eveleth Stevens, chief engineer, 1916 to 1928.
Bernard Blum, chief engineer, 1928 to March 1953.
Harold Robert Peterson (1896–1963), chief engineer, March 1953, to May 1962.
Douglas Harlow Shoemaker, chief engineer, May 1962, to March 2, 1970.

Locomotives

Trademark
In search of a trademark, the Northern Pacific considered and rejected many designs. Edwin Harrison McHenry, the Chief Engineer, was struck with a geometric design, a Taijitu in the Korean flag he saw while visiting the Korean exhibit at the Chicago World's Fair in 1893. The idea came to him that it was just the symbol for the long-sought-for trademark. With a slight modification, and rendered in red and black, the symbol became the railroad's trademark.

In 1876, photographer Frank Jay Haynes began contract work with the railroad for publicity photographs. In 1881 he met Charles Fee and through his 20-year friendship with Fee, Haynes became known as the "Official Photographer of the N.P.R.R". His "Northern Pacific Views" photographically documented over the years, the routes, destinations, infrastructure and equipment of the railroad.

References

Antonio Areddu, Vita e morte del marchese di Mores Antoine Manca (1858-1896), Cagliari, Condaghes, 2018
 Antonio Areddu. Il marchesato di Mores. Le origini, il duca dell´Asinara, le lotte antifeudali, l´abolizione del feudo e le vicende del marquis de Morès, Cagliari, Condaghes, 2011.

Further reading
 
 
 
 
 
 
 
 
 
 
 
 
 
 
 
 
 , for statistics on land sales
 
 
 
 
 
 
 , full text online of early history.

Primary sources and official sources
 Campbell, Marius Robinson. Guidebook of the Western United States, Part A: The Northern Pacific Route, with a side trip to Yellowstone Park. Washington (D.C.): Government Printing Office, 1915.

External links

 Northern Pacific Railway Corporate Records, Minnesota Historical Society.
 Northern Pacific Railway Historical Association (NPRHA) Quarterly magazine The Mainstreeter, calendar, annual convention, research pages.
 Teriffic! It's Northern Pacific! Articles, research and rosters for the Northern Pacific.
 NPTellTale The NPTellTale at finance.groups.yahoo.com/group/NPTellTale, is a Web-based discussion about the history of the Northern Pacific.
 White River Valley Museum (WRVM) Tri-annual presentations on NP history; the Albert E. Farrow photographic collection; the Robert E. Munn photographic collection; the Harold R. Burch locomotive manual collection.
 Northern Pacific Railway: First Northern Transcontinental brief history maintained by BNSF Railway.
 University of Washington Libraries Digital Collections – Transportation Photographs An ongoing digital collection of photographs depicting various modes of transportation in the Pacific Northwest region and Western United States during the first half of the 20th century. Includes images of the Northern Pacific Railway.
 Guide to the Northern Pacific Railway Company Records at the University of Montana Contains company materials predominantly from the late 1880s through the early 1940s.
 Guide to the Nolan Northern Pacific Railroad Collection, 1872–1947 at The Bancroft Library
 illustrated account of the Northern Pacific and other North American Railroads
Northern Pacific Railway Company Maps and Drawings. Yale Collection of Western Americana, Beinecke Rare Book and Manuscript Library.

 
Railway companies established in 1896
Railway companies disestablished in 1970
Predecessors of the Burlington Northern Railroad
Former Class I railroads in the United States
Companies based in Saint Paul, Minnesota
Former components in the Dow Jones Transportation Average
Defunct Idaho railroads
Defunct Minnesota railroads
Defunct Montana railroads
Defunct North Dakota railroads
Defunct Oregon railroads
Defunct Washington (state) railroads
Defunct Wisconsin railroads
Crow Wing County, Minnesota
Rail lines receiving land grants
History of Missoula, Montana
1896 establishments in the United States
1970 disestablishments in Minnesota
American companies disestablished in 1970